Erik Sture Ericson (15 February 1929 – 26 August 1990) was a Swedish modern pentathlete who competed at the 1960 Summer Olympics. He finished 21st individually and sixth with the Swedish team.

References

External links
 

1929 births
1990 deaths
Swedish male modern pentathletes
Olympic modern pentathletes of Sweden
Modern pentathletes at the 1960 Summer Olympics
Sportspeople from Halland County
20th-century Swedish people